The Widow’s Pension was one of the oldest established part of the Social Security system in the United Kingdom.  It was replaced by Bereavement benefit in April 2001.

Benefits for Widows were first established by the Widows', Orphans' and Old Age Contributory Benefits Act 1925 at a rate of 10 shillings a week for life, to stop on remarriage.

To get any benefit as a widow a woman had to be married to her husband, and be his only wife, at the time of his death. She was still entitled if separated or if a divorce had not reached the stage of decree absolute. All Widow's benefits stop on remarriage.

The claimant had to be over 45 but under 65 either when their husband died or when their Widowed Mother’s Allowance stopped.

There was also an entitlement an earnings related component.  Widows under 55 when their husband died or when they ceased being entitled to Widowed Mother’s Allowance got a reduction is 7% for each year they were below 55.

Widow’s Pension lasted until retirement and was taxable.

It counted in full for all Means-tested benefits. It was possible to get Incapacity Benefit together with widow’s pension.

See also
 Widowed Parent's Allowance
Mothers' pensions

References

Social security in the United Kingdom
Widowhood in the United Kingdom